Wölflin, Wölfflin is a surname that may refer to:

 Heinrich Wölfflin (1864–1945), Swiss art historian
 Johannes Wölflin (1345–1393), real name of John of Nepomuk
 Eduard Wölfflin (1831–1908), Swiss philologist (de)
 Kurt Wölfflin (1934–1998), Austrian author (de)

German-language surnames
Swiss-German surnames